Golmaal: Fun Unlimited is a 2006 Indian Hindi-language comedy film directed by Rohit Shetty, written by Neeraj Vora, and produced by Dhilin Mehta under Shree Ashtavinayak Cine Vision Limited and Parag Sanghvi under K Sera Sera Private Limited, with AA Films as distributor. The first installment of the Golmaal film series, it stars Ajay Devgn, Tusshar Kapoor, Arshad Warsi and Sharman Joshi along with Rimi Sen and Paresh Rawal. Golmaal was released on 14 July 2006. It is considered as a modern cult film.

The film is based on Mihir Bhuta's Gujarati play Aflatoon which was based on Harsh Shivsharan's Marathi play Ghar Ghar which had earlier been adapted into the 2001 Malayalam film Kakkakuyil. The opening comedy sequences were later used in the Kannada film Mast Maja Maadi (2008). Upon release, the film received mixed-to-positive reviews from critics. The film was commercially successful, grossing ₹467.2 million worldwide against a budget of ₹150 million.

Plot
The story revolves around the lives of Gopal, Lucky, Madhav and Laxman.

Laxman is a brilliant student who is diverted from his studies by his mischievous band of friends, Gopal, Madhav, and Lucky. Gopal is the muscle of the group, Madhav is the brain, and Lucky is the right one but a mute. The three friends use Laxman's hostel room for their mischievous activities. Laxman is peer-pressured into running a series of scams to earn himself and his friends some money and is punished by being thrown out of college. The foursome are indebted to a criminal/garage owner named Vasooli, who is constantly pursuing them. During a short halt in the woods, each one of them reveals their past. Laxman's mother used to work as a maid for a government officer. Madhav had a rough childhood, having been a witness to the constant fights between his parents. Lucky's father had abandoned him and his mother and remarried. His stepchildren used  to ridicule Lucky's mutism. Gopal reveals that he is an orphan who was raised in the Jamnadas Orphanage. Vasooli and his gang track down the group in the woods and chase them. The naughty foursome then finds refuge in the bungalow of a blind couple, Somnath and Mangala, who are waiting for their grandson, Sameer, inheriting their paternal grandparents' treasure chest hidden in the old couple's house. Gopal pretends to be Sameer returning from America, and enters the house, while the other three friends sneak in hidden.

A cat-and-mouse game unfolds as Laxman's body and Gopal's voice make up Sameer. Each time the blind couple comes amidst them, hilarious situations arise. Enter Nirali, the saucy girl-next-door, and the group now have time, place and 'resources' to fall in love. Their efforts at winning the lady's heart fail. Apart from their romantic interests, there is a quest for the chest. There is also a gangster named Babli who wants to steal the chest from the couple's bungalow. All his attempts are unintentionally and unknowingly thwarted by the foursome.

After the foursome finds a chest hidden behind an old painting in the house, despite Laxman pleading not to open the chest, Somnath reveals Sameer's death to Gopal, Laxman, Madhav, and Lucky. The real Sameer, along with his parents, was killed in a car crash on their way to India to meet his grandparents, after Somnath's son learned that Somnath and Mangala were permanently blinded in an accident. Somnath, with help from his friend, a police commissioner, went to America and lit the pyres of his son, daughter-in-law and grandson, the ashes of whom he later kept in an urn, as per the Hindu tradition, which he kept in the chest. Mangala overhears the entire story and is shocked; she breaks into tears and condemns her husband for lying to her all those years and not allowing her to cradle her grandson or light the pyres, while also criticizing the foursome for tricking her and hurting her feelings.

Babli then arrives with his gang and later reveals that he hid the diamonds in the urn Somnath was carrying as he returned to India. Pandurang, an assassin previously sent by Babli as an undercover servant, later joins Gopal's side on hearing about Sameer's truth and fights the gangsters off, with the fight finally ending with Gopal being accidentally stabbed by Babli in his butt with a knife, and falling unconscious soon after, but not before warning Madhav, Lucky and Laxman to not touch the knife, leaving the three friends in laughter. Babli also falls unconscious after seeing blood flowing from Gopal's butt.

After being admitted to a hospital, Gopal finally has the knife removed from his butt, and Babli is arrested for his crimes. Laxman, Gopal, Madhav and Lucky are then rewarded with ten per cent of the original value of the diamonds for arresting Babli. Nirali then chooses Lucky as her husband-to-be, saying that she wants a partner who only listens to her, and she found true love and loyalty in him and him alone, leaving the remaining three disappointed.

Cast
Ajay Devgan as Gopal "Gopu" Kumar Santoshi, who voices the fake Sameer.
Tusshar Kapoor as Lucky Gill
Arshad Warsi as Madhav Singh Ghai
Sharman Joshi  as Laxman Prasad Sharma, who acts as the fake Sameer's body.
Rimi Sen as Nirali
Paresh Rawal as Somnath Bhardwaj, Sameer's grandfather.
Sushmita Mukherjee as Mangala Bhardwaj, Sameer's grandmother.
Manoj Joshi as Harishchandra Ramchandra Mirchandani a.k.a. HaRaMi, Dean of Laxman's institute.
Mukesh Tiwari as Vasooli
Sanjay Mishra as Babli Bhai 
Farid Amiri as Monty, Nirali's friend.
Vrajesh Hirjee as Pandu Ranga, Somnath and Managala's ex-servant
Siddhartha Jadhav as Sattu Supari, Babli Bhai's contract killer.

Release

Critical reception
Sukanya Varma of Rediff said the film was "one wacky, goofy, paisa vasool ride" and that "the humour isn't exactly family audience material, and is more likely to be lapped up by college-going folk", rating the movie 3/5. Subhash K Jha of Sify wrote that "Golmaal's neatly structured ambit of asinine anarchy tickles the funny-bone, but it finally says nothing about the quality of modern life that we haven't already heard in all those blasts from the past that have come in recent weeks trying to create a ripple across our sense of humour." Taran Adarsh of Bollywood Hungama said that "Golmaal is a thoroughly enjoyable fare, the film has all it takes to hit the bull's eye" rating it 3.5/5.

Box office
Golmaal grossed  worldwide. At the end of its run, Golmaal was considered a success. It was declared a hit at the box office grossing about 290 million on a budget of 12 million.

Impact
Shortly after the film's release, Microsoft's video messenger platform Skype decided to include an emoji for Golmaal as well as several other Bollywood emojis in an effort to appeal to users in India and to honour Indian culture.

Soundtrack

The film's soundtrack is composed by Vishal–Shekhar, with lyrics by Kumaar; Vishal Dadlani wrote the lyrics for "Aage Peeche".

Sequel
The film spawned a sequel titled Golmaal Returns, which released on 29 October 2008. The sequel received mixed reviews from critics but had a bumper opening in India and grossed a total more than the original, and was declared a Hit. On 5 November 2010, the third sequel titled Golmaal 3 was released, which broke many records. The film was declared a blockbuster, and was the highest-grossing installment in the Golmaal film series until the fourth, Golmaal Again, came out on 20 October 2017.

Legacy
Golmaal Again, the fourth installment of the series and the film's third sequel, has many references lifted from the film; among these, however, the recurring reference of the "Jamnadas Orphanage", which was used in the film and its second sequel Golmaal 3, is explored in detail in Golmaal Again as part of its core plot. Devgn, Warsi, Kapoor and Mukesh Tiwari reprised their respective roles in all of the four films, while Vrajesh Hirjee and Sanjay Mishra have appeared in all four films as different characters.

Notes

External links
 Official Movie Website, archived from http://www.golmaalthefilm.com
 

2006 films
2000s Hindi-language films
2000s action comedy-drama films
2000s buddy films
Films scored by Vishal–Shekhar
Films directed by Rohit Shetty
Indian action comedy-drama films
Indian buddy films
Films scored by Sanjoy Chowdhury
Films shot in Goa
Films set in Goa
Indian films based on plays